Jafar Ebrahimi is an Iranian poet, born in Ardabil and living in Tehran. His pen name is Shahed. He is a children's and teen's author and poet, and has written 50 works including novels, poetry, and story collections.

References

Living people
People from Ardabil
20th-century Iranian poets
Year of birth missing (living people)
Iran's Book of the Year Awards recipients
21st-century Iranian poets